East Village is a census-designated place (CDP) in the town of Monroe, Fairfield County, Connecticut, United States. It occupies the northeast end of the town of Monroe, extending northeast to the Housatonic River (the town border with Oxford) and southwest to Walnut Street. It is bordered to the southeast by the city of Shelton and to the northwest by the town of Newtown.

East Village was first listed as a CDP prior to the 2020 census.

References 

Census-designated places in Fairfield County, Connecticut
Census-designated places in Connecticut